Saul White Jr., born (December 9, 1985) nicknamed Flip White or Flip, is a basketball player and a member of the Harlem Globetrotters. He was raised in Summit, Illinois. He received a full scholarship to play basketball at Moraine Valley Community College. After Moraine Valley, White Jr. played in the IBL league for the Ohio Hidden Gems. After playing in the IBL, he signed with the Harlem Globetrotters.

References

External links
 Harlem Globetrotters profile

Living people
Harlem Globetrotters players
American men's basketball players
People from Summit, Illinois
Year of birth missing (living people)
Basketball players from Illinois
Sportspeople from Cook County, Illinois
Junior college men's basketball players in the United States